Liam Coogans (born 31 October 1996) is a Scottish footballer who last played for Edusport as a forward.

Career
Coogans began his career at the academy of Airdrie United. He was first included in a senior matchday squad on 9 March 2013, remaining an unused substitute in their 3–3 home draw against Dunfermline Athletic in the Scottish Football League First Division. Two weeks later he made his professional debut, replacing Ryan Donnelly for the final 16 minutes of a 1–2 defeat to Raith Rovers at the Excelsior Stadium. Coogans made seven appearances in his first season, five as a starter, and scored once, opening a 2–1 win at Dunfermline in the last game of the season on 4 May, a result which confined the opponents to a relegation play-off.

Nonetheless, Airdrieonians were also relegated, and played the 2013–14 season in the renamed Scottish League One. He scored three goals in 23 games over the campaign, again finding the net in the last game of the season: on as a substitute, he finished a corner kick to conclude a 2–0 win over Arbroath which sent the visitors to Scottish League Two.

Coogans had training sessions at Scottish Premiership club Celtic, and Blackburn Rovers and Huddersfield Town of England's Football League Championship, spending time at the latter in January 2014. On 13 August of that year, he signed for Huddersfield on a two-year contract, aged 17. He was put in the Terriers' Development Squad, and on 2 September 2015 returned north of the border, joining Scottish Championship club Queen of the South on loan until 4 January 2016. After leaving Huddersfield in February 2016, Coogans began a trial with Scottish League One side Dunfermline Athletic, appearing in two matches for their development side, before signing for Brechin City.

References

External links
 
 

1996 births
Living people
Scottish footballers
Association football forwards
Airdrieonians F.C. players
Huddersfield Town A.F.C. players
Queen of the South F.C. players
Brechin City F.C. players
Scottish Football League players
Scottish Professional Football League players
Fauldhouse United F.C. players
Linlithgow Rose F.C. players
East Kilbride F.C. players
Caledonian Braves F.C. players